State Route 228 (SR 228), also known as Jiggs Highway, is a  state highway in Elko County, Nevada, United States, that connects Jiggs with Nevada State Route 227 (SR 227/Lamoille Highway) in Spring Creek.

Route description

SR 228 begins at an intersection with Circle Ranch Road near the southern end of Mound Valley, just south of the unincorporated community of Jiggs. (The road continues south from SR 228 as Harrison Pass Road [CR 717], heading southeasterly toward Ruby Valley and the southern terminus of State Route 767 [Ruby Valley Road]. [Harrison Pass Road is asphalt paved until just before reaching Harrison Pass in the Ruby Mountains.] Circle Rand Road heads west as a dirt road toward Huntington Valley.)

From its southern terminus, SR 228 heads northerly as an asphalt paved, two-lane, undivided highway and immediately crosses an unnamed creek (a tributary of Smith Creek). Next the route passes through Jiggs and crosses Smith Creek itself (within the community). North of Jiggs, SR 228 briefly curves to the northeast before resuming its northerly course to ascend out of the Mound Valley. Continuing northerly it passes by the east side of Zunino Reservoir and the Zunino/Jiggs Reservoir Recreation Area

North of the reservoir, SR 228 curves slightly and briefly to the northwest before crossing Cottonwood Creek and resuming its northerly course. After crossing Willow Creek it connects with the west end of Woods Lane (which heads east toward the unincorporated community of Lee). Farther north, the highway curves slightly west to pass by west side of the main part of the indian reservation for the South Fork Band of the Te-Moak Tribe of Western Shoshone Indians (South Fork Reservation). After crossing the South Fork Humboldt River the route again resumes a northerly course and passes to the east of the South Fork State Recreation Area and the South Fork Reservoir. SR 228 continues north to pass between several exclave areas of the South Fork Reservation and pass through the east side of and then the northwest corner of two more exclave areas of the reservation, crossing Tenmile Creek along the way.

Curving slightly east, SR 228 begins running along the southwestern border of the census-designated place of Spring Creek before reaching its northern terminus at an intersection with SR 227 (Lamoille Highway). (Beyond the northern terminus of SR 228, the road continues north–northeast into Spring Creek as Spring Valley Parkway to loop clockwise back to itself.

History
What is now SR 228 was designated as part of State Route 46 prior to 1976.

Major intersections

See also

 List of state highways in Nevada

References

External links

228
Transportation in Elko County, Nevada